Achotillo may refer to:
 Caryocar amygdaliferum, a plant native to the rain forests of the Choco region of Colombia and Panama.
 Nephelium lappaceum, a plant native to the Malay-Indonesian regionthat provides the edible "Rambutan" fruit.

References